The 5th Standing Committee of the Supreme People's Assembly (SPA) was elected by the 1st Session of the 5th Supreme People's Assembly on 28 December 1972. It was replaced on 17 December 1977 by the 6th SPA Standing Committee.

Members

References

Citations

Bibliography
Books:
 

5th Supreme People's Assembly
Presidium of the Supreme People's Assembly
1972 establishments in North Korea
1977 disestablishments in North Korea